Two-way satellite time and frequency transfer (TWSTFT) is a high-precision long distance time and frequency transfer mechanism used between time bureaux to determine and distribute time and frequency standards.

 TWSTFT is being evaluated as an alternative to be used by the Bureau International des Poids et Mesures in the determination of International Atomic Time (TAI), as a complement to the current standard method of simultaneous observations of GPS transmissions.

External links
 TWSTFT page at the National Physical Laboratory
 TWSTFT page at the Physikalisch-Technische Bundesanstalt
 NIST TWSTFT page
 TWSTFT page at the US Naval Observatory

Time
Telecommunications techniques
Synchronization